The North Texas Conference is an Annual Conference (a regional episcopal area of the United Methodist Church). This conference encompasses a triangle-shaped northern portion of the state of Texas that spans from Dallas to Wichita Falls to Paris.  The conference includes a small geographic area relative to most annual conferences. The North Texas Conference comprises 301 churches, 141,827 members, 4 districts and 20 counties.

Administrative offices are located in Plano, Texas. It is part of the South Central Jurisdictional Conference. On September 1, 2012, Bishop Michael McKee began leading the conference.

Districts

The North Texas Annual Conference is subdivided into four smaller regions, called "districts", which provide further administrative functions for the operation of local churches in cooperation with each other.  Each district has a District Superintendent who has a vital role in determining the appointments of clergy to local churches.  The districts that are comprised by the North Texas Conference are:

 Metro District.  The Metro District comprises most of Dallas County. The 79 churches and fellowships in the Metro District share a mission field that is the most economically, ethnically, and culturally diverse part of the North Texas Conference. Persons living in the Metro District face unique struggles and challenges. Likewise, the churches that comprise the Metro District have unique ways of assessing their needs, reaching new persons, and responding to their neighbors. The Metro District allows the District Superintendent to oversee the pastors and laity of these 79 congregations to dream dreams and implement measurable and creative ways of reaching the neighbors and neighborhoods in the Metro area. Over the next 10 years it is expected that the Metro District will increase in population by 9%. District Superintendent is Reverend Camille Gaston.

 North Central District. The North Central District mission field is one of continued growth. Projected growth in parts of Dallas, Wise, and Kaufman counties is considerable. Expansive growth is expected in Denton, Collin, and Rockwall counties. Overall the North Central District can anticipate 39% population growth by 2019. By 2019 the population of the North Central District will almost equal the Metro District's population. The 66 churches and fellowships in the North Central District share a mission field that is developing, accelerating, and expanding. The District Superintendent, pastors, and churches of the North Central District have a unique and evolving mission field and need to strategize, implement, and reach the largest influx of persons moving into North Texas in the next 10 years. District Superintendent is Reverend Dr. Ronald Henderson.

 East District. The East District is made up of 88 churches on the eastern side of the North Texas Conference. It stretches from Greenville on the West to Mt. Vernon on the East, Bonham to Avery on the north and Aley to Winnsboro on the South. Sixty two pastors serve with over 12,000 professing members to minister the grace of Christ to more than 116,000 households in this broad mission field. Through congregations that are county seat, town and country, family chapels, college campuses, and even a 'cowboy' church, the East District is alive and active, making disciples of Jesus Christ for the transformation of the world. The District Superintendent is Reverend Victor Casad.

 Northwest District. The Northwest District comprises rural, town and country, and county seat congregations in the North Texas Conference. The 68 churches and fellowships in the Northwest District can anticipate 6% population growth over the next decade. Relating, reaching and responding to the lifestyles and mindset of those who live in our rural town and country settings take a different set of skills for the District Superintendent, pastors and churches to connect, grow and send forth disciples who will transform the world for Christ.The District Superintendent is Reverend L. Marvin Guier, III.

Centers

Center for Leadership Development.  The Center for Leadership Development (CLD) exists to help clergy and laity recognize God’s call of Living Discipleship Fruitfulness, Leading Congregational Fruitfulness and Developing Missional Fruitfulness to live out our mission “to make disciples of Jesus Christ for the transformation of the world.” The Center Director is Reverend Marti Soper.

Center for Missional Outreach.  The Center for Missional Outreach works to understand and combat the causes of poverty through connectionalism.  The Center’s goal is to facilitate this process by promoting best practices and helping churches that need a little extra assistance and mentoring.  The Center’s belief is that ministry with the poor begins by listening to and learning from those affected by poverty, those with firsthand knowledge of circumstances and potential solutions. The Center Director is Reverend Dr. Larry George.

Center for New Church Development and Congregational Transformation. The Center for New Church Development and Congregational Transformation exists to create a culture of “churches planting churches” as we plant new communities of faith, and to facilitate congregational transformation in existing churches. The Center Director is Reverend Jim Ozier.

Center for Connectional Resources.  The Center for Connectional Resources provides administrative services for the churches of The North Texas Conference.  These services include the central treasury, pensions, health insurance, property and liability insurance, and others. The Center Director is Reverend Jodi Smith.

Institutions (owned by or with a strong relationship with the North Texas Conference) 
Dallas Bethlehem Center
Bridgeport Camp & Conference Center
C.C. Young Home
Methodism's Breadbasket
Methodist Medical Center of Dallas
Project Transformation
Prothro Center at Lake Texoma
Southern Methodist University (including Perkins School of Theology)
Texas Methodist Foundation
Wesley-Rankin Community Center
Wesley Village
ZIP Code Connection

Statistics
2014 Membership:  141,827
2014 Number of Churches in Conference: 301
2014 Number of Counties: 20

2016 General Conference and Jurisdictional Conference Delegates
The following delegates were elected at the 2014 North Texas Annual Conference held in June 2014 for the 2016 General Conference on May 10–20, 2016, in Portland, Oregon, and the 2016 South Central Jurisdictional Conference on July 13–16, 2016, in Wichita, Kansas.

Clergy Delegates to General Conference

 Jan Davis, First UMC Rowlett
 Clayton Oliphint, First UMC Richardson
 Jill-Jackson Sears, Lake Highlands UMC, Dallas
 Dr. Ronald Henderson, North Central District Superintendent
 Don Underwood, Christ UMC, Plano
 
Lay Delegates to General Conference

 Tim Crouch, First UMC Denton
 Linda Parks, Conference Lay Leader, Northwest District
 Kelly Carpenter, Lovers Lane UMC, Dallas
 Ricky Harrison, First UMC Richardson
 Richard Hearne, University Park UMC, Dallas

Clergy Delegates to Jurisdictional Conference

 Owen Ross, Christ’s Foundry, Dallas
 Joe Stobaugh, Grace Avenue UMC, Frisco
 Lisa Greenwood, Texas Methodist Foundation
 Ouida Lee, Church of the Disciple, DeSoto
 Tim Morrison, Custer Road UMC, Plano

Lay Delegates to Jurisdictional Conference

 Gretchen Toler-Debus, Oak Lawn UMC, Dallas
 Daniel Soliz, Elmwood UMC, Dallas
 Sally Vonner, First UMC Grand Prairie
 Henry Lessner, Assoc. Conference Lay Leader, North Central District
 Timmy Clark, First UMC Rockwall

Alternates

Clergy:
 Andy Stoker, First UMC Dallas
 Derek Jacobs, The Village, DeSoto
 Holly Bandel, Stonebridge UMC, McKinney
Lay:
 Herman Totten, Trinity UMC, Denton
 Serena Echert, Conference Secretary of Global Ministries 
 Don Wiley, Lovers Lane UMC, Dallas

Key Conference Leaders
Bishop Michael McKee
Bishop Michael McKee, Bishop effective September 2012    
Extended Cabinet of North Texas Conference     
Center Directors (see listed above in Centers section)
District Superintendents (see listed above in Districts section)
Delegates to 2016 General Conference / Jurisdictional Conference (see listed above in  Delegates section)
Linda Parks, Conference Lay Leader effective July 2012

See also 
 Annual Conferences of the United Methodist Church

References

External links 
 North Texas Conference of The United Methodist Church

Methodism in Texas
United Methodism by region
United Methodist Annual Conferences